Hanggu-guyŏk is a kuyŏk in Namp'o Special City, South P'yŏngan province, North Korea.

Choe Thae-bok, the chairman of the Supreme People's Assembly, was born in Hanggu-guyŏk.

Administrative divisions
Hanggu-guyŏk is divided into 18 neighbourhoods (tong) and 10 villages (ri).

Transportation
Hanggu district is served by the P'yŏngnam Line of the Korean State Railway.

References

Districts of Nampo